Laura Cantrell (born July 16, 1967) is a country singer-songwriter and DJ from Nashville, Tennessee.

Biography
Cantrell moved to New York City from her native Nashville to study English at Columbia University. She briefly recorded songs with future Superchunk guitarist Mac McCaughan and others in a lo-fi band called Bricks and deejaying on the university's radio station, WKCR, until joining WFMU after her graduation in 1993.

Her singing career began when she was at college, performing with various local groups. She later befriended John Flansburgh of They Might Be Giants, with whom she sings on the band's Apollo 18 (1992). Flansburgh also released her first solo material: an EP on his "Hello CD of the Month Club" in June 1996, which was reissued in 2004 as The Hello Recordings.

Cantrell married Jeremy Tepper, the founder of Diesel Only Records, in 1997. They have one daughter. Cantrell went on to release all but one of her studio albums on Diesel Only.

Cantrell reached wider recognition in 2000 with her debut album, Not the Tremblin' Kind. The album reached the attention of legendary UK DJ John Peel, who wrote of it, "[It is] my favourite record of the last ten years and possibly my life".  She went on to record five sessions for Peel and dedicated her 2005 album, Humming by the Flowered Vine, to his memory.

In the spring of 2011, Cantrell released Kitty Wells Dresses: Songs Of the Queen of Country Music, "a recording she made in honor of one of her heroines, the great Kitty Wells", taking its title from an original song of Cantrell's written in tribute to Wells.

Her 4th album of original material, No Way There From Here, was released in the UK in September 2013, on Shoeshine/ Spit and Polish Records. The release preceded a tour of the UK.

Cantrell's music has been celebrated in the press including features in The New York Times. In recent years, she has been a contributor to The New York Times and VanityFair.com.

Cantrell used to present a weekly country and old-time music radio show on WFMU called The Radio Thrift Shop.  Since October 2005 she has only made occasional appearances on the station. In August 2017, she began hosting Dark Horse Radio, a weekly 30-minute program on SiriusXM featuring the music of George Harrison.

Career outside music

In the early part of her career, Cantrell combined her musical activities with a day job as a vice-president in the equity research department of Bank of America. She left this position in 2003. In 2011 she began working as a recruiter for AllianceBernstein.

Discography

Albums
 Not the Tremblin' Kind (2000)
 When the Roses Bloom Again (2002)
 Humming by the Flowered Vine (2005)
 Kitty Wells Dresses: Songs of the Queen of Country Music (2011) (UK chart peak: No. 138)
 No Way There From Here (2014)

EPs
 Laura Cantrell (1996) (Hello Records 67)
 All the Same to You (2002)
 The Hello Recordings (2004) – Reissue of 1996 EP
 Humming Songs: Acoustic Performances from the Flowered Vine (2006) (download only)
 Trains and Boats and Planes (2008)

Other releases
 This Is Next Year: A Brooklyn-Based Compilation (2001) – (Arena Rock Recording Co.)
 Ojo (album by Vince Bell) (2018)

References

External links
 
 The Radio Thrift Shop website

American women country singers
American country singer-songwriters
People from Nashville, Tennessee
Living people
1960s births
Drag City (record label) artists
Columbia College (New York) alumni
American radio DJs
Singer-songwriters from Tennessee
Country musicians from Tennessee
American women radio presenters
21st-century American women